The Florida Complex League Nationals are a Rookie-level affiliate of the Washington Nationals, competing in the Florida Complex League of Minor League Baseball. Prior to the 2021 season, the team was known as the Gulf Coast League Nationals. The team plays its home games in West Palm Beach, Florida, at FITTEAM Ballpark of the Palm Beaches. The team previously played at Space Coast Stadium from their inaugural 2005 season through the end of the 2016 season. The team is composed mainly of players who are in their first year of professional baseball either as draftees or non-drafted free agents.

History

GCL Expos (1969–2004)
From 1969 to 2004, the team was known as the Gulf Coast League Expos and was a minor league affiliate of the Montreal Expos. The team played in the Gulf Coast League from 1969 to 1970, in 1974, in 1977, and again from 1986 to 2004.

The team was based in various Florida cities during these years: in Sarasota in 1969, in Bradenton in 1970, in Sarasota in 1974 and 1977, in Bradenton from 1986 to 1991, in West Palm Beach from 1992 to 1997, in Jupiter in 1998 and 1999, in Bradenton in 2000, in Jupiter in 2001, and in Melbourne from 2002 to 2004.

The team won two Gulf Coast League championships over the course of its history, the first in 1969 under manager J. W. Porter and the second in 1991 under manager Keith Snider.

GCL Nationals (2005–2020)
After the 2004 season, when the Montreal Expos relocated and became the Washington Nationals, the Gulf Coast League Expos became the Gulf Coast League Nationals, beginning play as such in the 2005 season.

In 2013, the team finished their regular season with a record of 49–9. This .845 winning percentage was the highest winning percentage for a full regular season ever achieved by a Minor League Baseball team based in the United States. The only minor league team to have a better winning percentage over a full regular season  was the Toronto Blue Jays 1992 Dominican Summer League team based in the Dominican Republic, which finished at 68–2 with a .971 winning percentage. The Nationals then won all three of their playoff games, defeating the Gulf Coast League Pirates in a single-game semifinal playoff and sweeping the Gulf Coast League Red Sox in the best-of-three league championship series, to become the 2013 Gulf Coast League champions.

The team pulled off a historic feat on July 23, 2017, no-hitting the Gulf Coast League Marlins in both ends of a double-header. Four Nationals pitchers appeared in the two seven-inning games. In the first game, which the Nationals won 4–0, Joan Baez pitched six innings, striking out seven and retiring the last 14 batters he faced, and Jose Jimenez pitched the final inning. In the second game, a 1–0 Nationals win, Jaren Johnson pitched the first four innings in his seventh professional appearance and second professional start, and Gilberto Chu relieved him to finish the game with three no-hit innings.

The start of the 2020 season was postponed due to the COVID-19 pandemic before ultimately being canceled on June 30.

FCL Nationals (2021–present)
Prior to the 2021 season, the Gulf Coast League was renamed as the Florida Complex League.

Roster

Season-by-season results

References

External links
 Official website

Nats
Nats
Washington Nationals minor league affiliates
Baseball teams established in 1969
Montreal Expos minor league affiliates
1969 establishments in Florida